Alberschwende is a municipality and a village in the district of Bregenz in the Austrian state of Vorarlberg.

Population

Notable people
 Hermann Gmeiner, Austrian philanthropist, founder of SOS Children's Villages

References

Bregenz Forest Mountains
Cities and towns in Bregenz District